Schinznach Bad railway station is a railway station in the municipality of Schinznach-Bad, in the Swiss canton of Aargau. It is an intermediate stop on the standard gauge Baden–Aarau line of Swiss Federal Railways.

Services
The following services stop at Schinznach Bad:

 Aargau S-Bahn : half-hourly service between Aarau and Turgi, with every other train continuing from Aarau to Sursee.

References

External links 
 
 

Railway stations in the canton of Aargau
Swiss Federal Railways stations